The Shoes are a Dutch Nederbeat band from Zoeterwoude that had a string of hits from 1966. The group was founded in 1963 as The White Shoes. They still perform.

Band members
Theo van Es : vocals
Wim van Huis : guitar
Jan Versteegen : bass
Henk Versteegen : drums

Discography

Albums

Singles

Singles chart

|-
|align="left"|Standing and staring|| ||3-12-1966||13||12||
|-
|align="left"|Na na na|| ||18-2-1967||6||12||
|-
|align="left"|Peace and privacy|| ||20-5-1967||14||6||
|-
|align="left"|Farewell in the rain|| ||7-10-1967||14||8||
|-
|align="left"|No money for roses|| ||9-3-1968||14||9||
|-
|align="left"|Man's life|| ||25-5-1968||11||7||
|-
|align="left"|Don't you cry for a girl|| ||7-9-1968||5||9||
|-
|align="left"|Emptiness|| ||25-1-1969||34||3||
|-
|align="left"|That tender looking angel|| ||10-5-1969||26||4||
|-
|align="left"|Happiness is in this beat|| ||2-8-1969||19||5||
|-
|align="left"|Daylight|| ||29-11-1969||35||2||
|-
|align="left"|Osaka|| ||11-4-1970||6||10||
|-
|align="left"|Adios corazon|| ||18-7-1970||30||3||
|-
|align="left"|Face to face|| ||9-2-1974||12||7||
|-
|align="left"|Make up your make up|| ||9-11-1974||26||4||
|}

References

Dutch musical groups
The Shoes